Progressive Broadcasting Corporation (PBC) is a Philippine radio and television network owned by businessman Alfredo L. Henares with 70% equity share together with Joselito N. Pedero (15.3%) and Dennis T. Villareal (14.5%). The company was registered in the Philippine Securities and Exchange Commission (SEC) on October 6, 1986. Its studios are located at Unit 4002 Summit One Tower, Shaw Boulevard, Mandaluyong. PBC derives most of its income by selling airtime to blocktimers.

PBC's flagship UHF TV station in Mega Manila, UNTV Channel 37 (now UNTV News and Rescue) is operated and maintained by its content provider Breakthrough and Milestones Productions International, Inc. (BMPI), led by veteran broadcaster and TV host "Kuya" Daniel Razon. PBC is also known for its FM station DWNU (Wish 107.5) in Mega Manila, it formerly aired NU 107 (until 2010) and Win Radio (until 2014, moved to DWKY 91.5 FM).

History

Legislative Franchise
It was granted a 25-year legislative franchise on November 19, 1991, under Republic Act (R.A.) 7163 to construct, install, operate and maintain commercial radio and TV broadcasting stations in Metro Manila, Region I, Region VI and Region VII signed by Philippine President Corazon C. Aquino. On September 23, 1995, R.A. 8162 was approved to amend its franchise extending its operations throughout the Philippines. On August 24, 2015, House Bill No. 5940 was approved by the House of Representatives and by the Senate of the Philippines on January 18, 2016, to extend PBC's franchise. On May 18, 2016, President Benigno S. Aquino III signed Republic Act No. 10820 which renewed PBC's license for another 25 years. The law grants PBC a franchise to construct, install, operate, and maintain, for commercial purposes, radio broadcasting stations and television stations, including digital television system, with the corresponding facilities such as relay stations, throughout the Philippines.

Radio

On August 31, 1987, an unknown radio station started broadcasting at the frequency of 107.5 on the FM band. Playing what was then known as new wave, the station aired for a month, no call letters, no jocks. When they finally announced "This is dwNU, if you're listening, please call..." After mentioning the phone number on air, the phone rang constantly for three hours.

DWNU 107.5 FM was the brainchild of banker/businessman Atom Henares, and radio veteran Mike Pedero. Born out of the need to come up with a product that would set the standard for good taste in music amongst the youths, NU 107 blasted the airwaves with rock, music that is "dynamic, young, passionate, creative, and always ready to renew itself."

On November 7, 2010, NU 107 made its final broadcast and it was rebranded as 107.5 Win Radio with a Hot AC (masa) format on November 9, 2010. Win Radio transferred to 91.5 FM and currently managed by Zimzam Management Corporation led by Manuelito "Manny" Luzon.

In 2014, UNTV-BMPI became the content provider for 107.5 FM. The newest station held a soft launching during UNTV's 10th anniversary concert held at the World Trade Center on June 26, 2014. The station was later on rebranded as 107.5 Wish FM. Formal launching was launched on August 10, 2014, at the World Trade Center. Meanwhile, PBC's Cebu, Cagayan de Oro, Davao and Iloilo FM stations retained the Win Radio brand. However, in 2016, after House Bill No. 5982 was passed into law, Mabuhay Broadcasting System acquired the provincial stations of PBC.

Television

In July 2001, PBC ventured to UHF television through UNTV 37. UNTV started in May 2002 as a television counterpart to NU 107, airing rock-related music videos. In its early years, UNTV gained viewers' attention through the program Strangebrew, a.k.a. Ang show na may tama. Starting in 2003, the station started airing religious content from Ang Dating Daan, a former blocktimer in SBN 21. In 2004, UNTV began airing contents from Tapatan, Inc. led by veteran broadcaster Jay Sonza. UNTV gradually reduced and eventually stopped airing rock music videos. Since then, it became a 24/7 television station, airing not only religious programs, but also news and information content. In 2007, Breakthrough and Milestones Productions International, Inc. or BMPI led by veteran broadcaster Daniel Razon, took over the operations of the network, and repositioned itself as public service channel.

The transformation from its original incarnation became more distinct after a change in the pronunciation of the station's name to you-en-tee-vee or "you-en" television instead of un-tee-vee

Stations
As of December 2021:

UNTV stations

Analog

Digital

Inactive television stations

FM stations
As of December 2021:

Current

Former

Television

UNTV

PBC's flagship television network is UNTV, also known as UNTV News and Rescue). It was launched in July 2001 with various rebranding since then. UNTV is referred to as the “Kasangbahay Network” in reference to a Biblical passage about God's household. Its studios are located at the La Verdad Christian College Building, Bagong Barrio, EDSA Caloocan. Its future headquarters in Quezon City, the UNTV Broadcast Center, is currently under construction. In 2015, UNTV started testing ISDB-T, the approved digital terrestrial television (DTT) standard in the Philippines and is only available in Mega Manila.

UNTV Subchannels

UNTV's Social TV (STV) is a digital television subchannel with contents coming from social media creators and contributors. In 2020, it was replaced by the same video feed from UNTV News and Rescue at 1080p quality. Another UNTV digital television subchannel is Ang Dating Daan Television (ADDTV) which airs religious programs by Members Church of God International. It was later on rebranded as Truth Channel.

Radio

DWNU-FM, also known as Wish 107.5, is the flagship FM radio station of PBC. It airs music and features programs provided by Breakthrough and Milestones Production International, Inc. as its content provider.

See also
Philippine television networks
List of Philippine media companies

References

 
Members Church of God International
Mass media companies of the Philippines
Radio stations in the Philippines
Television networks in the Philippines
Television in Metro Manila
Mass media companies established in 1987
Radio stations established in 1987
Television channels and stations established in 2001
1987 establishments in the Philippines
Privately held companies of the Philippines